{{DISPLAYTITLE:15-hydroxyprostaglandin dehydrogenase (NADP+)}}

In enzymology, a 15-hydroxyprostaglandin dehydrogenase (NADP+) is an enzyme that catalyzes the chemical reaction

(13E)-(15S)-11alpha,15-dihydroxy-9-oxoprost-13-enoate + NADP+  (13E)-11alpha-hydroxy-9,15-dioxoprost-13-enoate + NADPH + H+

Thus, the two substrates of this enzyme are (13E)-(15S)-11alpha,15-dihydroxy-9-oxoprost-13-enoate and NADP+, whereas its 3 products are (13E)-11alpha-hydroxy-9,15-dioxoprost-13-enoate, NADPH, and H+.

This enzyme belongs to the family of oxidoreductases, specifically those acting on the CH-OH group of donor with NAD+ or NADP+ as acceptor. The systematic name of this enzyme class is (13E)-(15S)-11alpha,15-dihydroxy-9-oxoprost-13-enoate:NADP+ 15-oxidoreductase. Other names in common use include NADP+-dependent 15-hydroxyprostaglandin dehydrogenase, NADP+-linked 15-hydroxyprostaglandin dehydrogenase, NADP+-specific 15-hydroxyprostaglandin dehydrogenase, type II 15-hydroxyprostaglandin dehydrogenase, and 15-hydroxyprostaglandin dehydrogenase (NADP+).

Structural studies

As of late 2007, only one structure has been solved for this class of enzymes, with the PDB accession code .

References

 
 

EC 1.1.1
NADPH-dependent enzymes
Enzymes of known structure